Mike Friedrich (born March 27, 1949) is an American comic book writer and publisher best known for his work at Marvel and DC Comics, and for publishing the anthology series Star*Reach, one of the first independent comics. He is also an artists representative.

His notable works include runs as the regular writer of DC's Justice League of America and Marvel's Iron Man.

Biography

Early life and career

Mike Friedrich, who is unrelated to fellow Silver Age of Comics writer Gary Friedrich, entered comics professionally after years of writing to DC letter columns in the 1960s and developing a mail acquaintanceship with the famously responsive editor Julius Schwartz. "My letter-writing began around the time the 'new look' Batman was introduced, though I'd been a fan of Julie's for two or three years before then. A couple of years later it turned into a bit of correspondence as Julie began to send short replies," Friedrich recalled. Schwartz, after rejecting an Elongated Man story Friedrich submitted, bought Friedrich's first professional script on May 10, 1967, a 10-page Robin backup story ("Menace of the Motorcycle Marauders", drawn by penciler Chic Stone and inker Joe Giella) and eventually published in Batman #202 (cover-dated June 1968) as Friedrich's third published comics story.

Friedrich used the $10-per-page payment to visit New York City the following month, after his high school graduation, and took a DC Comics tour in order to meet Schwartz in person. "That first summer," Friedrich recalled, "he worked with me on a handful of scripts, including the one that was first to be published, The Spectre #3" (April 1968; reprinted in Adventure Comics Digest #496, Feb. 1983), in which Friedrich teamed with artist Neal Adams on the 25-page supernatural superhero story, "Menace of the Mystic Mastermind". Almost immediately afterward, the same month, Friedrich published the full-length Batman story "The Man Who Radiated Fear", penciled by Stone ghosting for Bob Kane, in Batman #200 (March 1968).

DC and Marvel Comics
Friedrich quickly began writing stories for a number of DC publications, including Challengers of the Unknown, Detective Comics, The Flash and Teen Titans. With penciler Jerry Grandenetti in Showcase #80 (Feb. 1969), he reintroduced the supernatural-mystery story narrator the Phantom Stranger, created by John Broome and Carmine Infantino in 1952. 
He wrote the 30th anniversary Batman story in Detective Comics #387 (May 1969) which was drawn by Bob Brown. Friedrich's first extended run on a title was on the superhero-team series Justice League of America from #86–99 (Dec. 1970 – June 1972); in the story  "The Most Dangerous Dreams of All" in issue #89 (May 1971), he himself makes a cameo appearance and breaks the fourth wall at a time when such experimentation in the mainstream was rare. He had previously scripted "His Name Is... Kane", in House of Mystery #180 (June 1969), in which the short tale's penciler, Gil Kane, stars as an artist drawing for DC Comics and venturing into the physical House of Mystery. Friedrich co-created Merlyn in Justice League of America #94 (Nov. 1971) and the character was adapted into the Arrow TV series in 2012.

Moving to Marvel after four years, Friedrich scripted every issue of Iron Man but three from #48–81 (July 1972 – Dec. 1975). In issue #55 (Feb. 1973), he co-scripted the introduction of the popular characters Thanos and Drax the Destroyer, created and co-scripted by artist Jim Starlin.

Other work includes issues of Marvel's Captain America, Captain Marvel (where he worked with artist Jim Starlin on the latter's transition to writer on an acclaimed run of that series), The Power of Warlock, "Ka-Zar" in Astonishing Tales, "Ant-Man" in Marvel Feature, and The Outlaw Kid, writing a short-lived revival of Doug Wildey's Western series from Marvel's 1950s predecessor, Atlas Comics.

Star*Reach
Friedrich's most notable contribution may be his 1970s anthology series Star*Reach, a forerunner of the independently produced comics that proliferated, beginning in the 1980s, with the rise of the "direct market" of comic-book stores. Star*Reach styled itself as a "ground-level" comic book – not an underground comix publication, but also not mainstream or "overground". Eighteen issues were released between 1974 and 1979, with Friedrich's same-name publishing company expanding to other series, including Quack; Imagine; and Lee Marrs' Pudge, Girl Blimp, along with a number of one-shot comics, before closing down. For this and other efforts, Friedrich received an Inkpot Award at the 1980 San Diego Comic-Con.

Comics historian Richard J. Arndt wrote in 2006 that Star*Reach

Friedrich closed Star*Reach as a publisher in 1979 but reopened it as a talent agency in 1982. In the 2000s, Friedrich served as Chair of the National Legislative Committee for the Graphic Artists Guild, while a member of the California/Northern chapter.

WonderCon
Friedrich, in partnership with Joe Field, owned and operated the San Francisco Bay Area comic book convention WonderCon for 15 years before selling it to Comic-Con International in 2001.

Awards
In 2019, Friedrich was awarded the Bill Finger Award to recognize his contributions to the industry.

Bibliography

Atlas/Seaboard Comics
 Wulf the Barbarian #4 (1975)

DC Comics

 Batman #200, 219, 221–222, 225 (Batman lead stories); #202, 227, 229–231, 234–236, 239–242 (Robin backup stories) (1968–1972)
 Challengers of the Unknown #66 (1969) 
 Detective Comics #384–385 (Batgirl backup stories); #386, 390–391, 402–403 (Robin backup stories); #387 (Batman lead story) (1969–1970)
 The Flash #186, 195, 197–198, 207 (1969–1971)  
 Forbidden Tales of Dark Mansion #6 (1972)  
 Green Lantern #61, 73–74 (1968–1970)   
 House of Mystery #180 (1969)   
 House of Secrets #81, 90 (1969–1971)  
 Justice League of America #86–92, 94–99 (1970–1972)   
 Our Army at War #207, 217, 227, 236 (1969–1971)   
 Phantom Stranger vol. 2 #1–3 (1969)  
 Showcase #80 (Phantom Stranger) (1969)  
 Spectre #3, 9 (1968–1969)  
 Superman #255 (World of Krypton backup story) (1972)  
 Teen Titans #19 (1969)  
 The Witching Hour #7 (1970)  
 World's Finest Comics #200, 209 (1971–1972)

Marvel Comics

 Adventure into Fear #20 (Morbius, the Living Vampire) (1974)  
 Astonishing Tales #16–20  (Ka-Zar) (1973) 
 Captain America #171 (1974)  
 Captain Marvel #24, 26–28, 35 (1973–1974)  
 Dracula Lives #7 (1974)  
 Iron Man #48–55, 58–75, 77, 79–81 (1972–1975)   
 Ka-Zar vol. 2 #1–5 (1974)  
 Marvel Feature'’ #4–7, 8 (four page framing sequence only), 9–10 (Ant Man); #12 (The Thing and Iron Man) (1972–1973)  
 Marvel Super Action #1 (Bobbi Morse/Huntress) (1976)  
 Outlaw Kid #10–12 (1972)  
 Sgt. Fury and his Howling Commandos #114 (1973)  
 Strange Tales #176–177 (Golem) (1974)  
 Sub-Mariner #54, 56 (1972)  
 Warlock #3–4, 7–8 (1972–1973)  
 Werewolf by Night #16–19 (1974)  
 Western Gunfighters #4–5 (1971)

Skywald Publications
 Butch Cassidy #1 (1971)
 Nightmare #1 (1970)

Star Reach
 Imagine #1–5 (1978–1979)
 Parsifal #1 (1978)
 Quack #1–6 (1976–1977)
 Star Reach #2–5, 7–8, 10–14, 16–18 (1975–1979)
 Within Our Reach #1 (1991)

References

External links
 Mike Friedrich at the Unofficial Handbook of Marvel Comics Creators
 Comic Book Artist'' Vol. 2, #2 (Summer 2003): Interview with Mike Friedrich

1949 births
American comics writers
Businesspeople from the San Francisco Bay Area
Comic book publishers (people)
DC Comics people
Inkpot Award winners
Literary agents
Living people
Marvel Comics writers
Silver Age comics creators
Bill Finger Award winners